The Ponsonby baronetcy, of Wootton in the County of Oxford, is a title in the Baronetage of the United Kingdom. It was created on 27 January 1956 for the Conservative politician Charles Ponsonby. He had earlier represented Sevenoaks in the House of Commons and served as Parliamentary Private Secretary to the Foreign Secretary Anthony Eden from 1941 to 1945. A member of the prominent Ponsonby family headed by the Earl of Bessborough, he was the son of the Hon. Edwin Charles William Ponsonby, fifth son of Charles Ponsonby, 2nd Baron de Mauley. , the title is held by his grandson, the third Baronet, who succeeded his father in 2010. The second Baronet was Lord Lieutenant of Oxfordshire between 1980 and 1996.

Ponsonby baronets, of Wootton (1956)
Sir Charles Edward Ponsonby, 1st Baronet (1879–1976)
Sir Ashley Charles Gibbs Ponsonby, 2nd Baronet KCVO, MC (1921–2010)
Sir Charles Ashley Ponsonby, 3rd Baronet (b. 1951)

The heir apparent is the present holder's son, Arthur Ashley Ponsonby (b. 1984).
The heir apparent's heir apparent is his son, Felix Thomas Charles Ponsonby (b. 2022).

See also
Earl of Bessborough
Baron de Mauley
Baron Ponsonby of Imokilly
Baron Ponsonby of Shulbrede
Baron Sysonby

Notes

References
Kidd, Charles, Williamson, David (editors). Debrett's Peerage and Baronetage (1990 edition). New York: St Martin's Press, 1990, 

Ponsonby